Park Seo-bo (b. 1931 in Yecheon, Korea) is a Korean painter, part of the first generation of modern artists in South Korea. He has been a prolific painter well known for his  paintings, and has been one of the most influential figures in modern Korean art history. He is now widely considered the godfather of Dansaekhwa originated in South Korea in 1970s.

Life

Early life
Seo-bo was born as the third son of 8 children in Yecheon County of North Gyeongsang, Chōsen in Japanese-occupied South Korea on 15 November 1931. He was originally named Jae Hong Park. The name Seo-bo has been used since 1955 as a pseudonym to avoid forced conscription. Around 1940, his family moved from Yecheon to Anseong in Gyeonggi Province where his father Jae Hoon Park started to work as a local solicitor at his own house. They lived comfortably in a big house. From childhood, Seo-bo loved drawing. He spent his time copying great pieces of oriental painting by the great living Korean artists. Although his father wanted him to study law, Seo-bo insisted on his pursuing art. In spite of his father's opposition, he entered Hongik University to study oriental painting under the lead of Yi Eungro.

Korean War

However, his happy freshman year was interrupted by the outburst of Korean War. He narrowly survived the war time chaos, experiencing his father's abrupt death, drafts both by North Korean and South Korean forces and long winter evacuating on foot from his hometown Anseong to Masan. Seo-bo barely managed to go back to school in 1952. Hongik University temporarily moved to Busan during the war time. He enrolled for the second year and changed his major to western painting because his professors of oriental painting were all gone. He learned painting from scratch under the lead of Whanki Kim for 3 more years and graduated in 1955. Although the ceasefire was announced in 1953, the whole country were suffering from poverty and immorality. There was competition between refugees, widows and orphans for food and money. Seo-bo was not different from them. He earned his school expenses by selling portraits to US soldiers on streets and restaurants. He slept in an empty classroom of the school and missed meals until someone was willing to buy one from him. He did paintings or drawings with the last drops of oil paint tubes and little pieces of charcoal that his classmates discarded and sometimes even with soy sauce he stole from a restaurant. He thought there was nobody to rely on in the world. He worked harder and harder for future success.

Art group activities
However, he became a fugitive. Although he completed his military service at Corps of Military Staff Clerks during the last semester, the government of Syngman Rhee broke its promise to let the Korean Army conscript the male graduates at the graduation ceremony. Informed by his friends at other universities, Seo-bo did not go to the ceremony and ran away immediately. He went to his friend with great knowledge about Chinese classics to ask to make up a new name for him. From that time on, Seo-bo pretended to be in his late 30s, wearing a fedora with a mustache and was called by the pseudonym. He even brought his best friend Kim Tschang-yeul as a bodyguard on his honeymoon trip along with his bride because he was a policeman. 

He received a prize at the Korean National Art Exhibition in 1954 as a student and again in 1955. However, the National Art Exhibition had been never free of troubles since it was established in 1949. Seo-bo declared objection to the National Art Exhibition with three of his school friends and opened their own group exhibition in 1956. That caught public attention and the newspapers spotlighted the young artists' defiance. From 1957 to 1960, Seo-bo participated in group exhibitions of Hyun-Dai Artists Association where he became close with Kim Tschang-yeul. The Hyun-Dae Artists Association is well known for initiating Informel for the first time in Korea.

Marriage and Job

He got married in 1958 and became a father to his first son Seung-jo in 1959. He did not get a proper job because he was a wanted draft evader. It was the time when modern paintings did not sell. His wife and child were suffering in poverty. Seo-bo needed a break-through in his life. So he left for Paris without hesitance when he was selected as a national representative young artist for the Young Painters of the World in Paris in 1961. It was a residency program organized by the French National Committee of International Association of Art with support of UNESCO. When he came back from Paris to Seoul, he started teaching at Hongik University, Seoul. However, he became a scapegoat in dynamics between professors and the private school foundation, which led to his resignation. Out of work, he stayed at home and happened to discover his life-long topic of resignation and self-discipline while observing his 3-year-old second son, Seung-ho. Since 1967, Seo-bo made an attempt on his first work of his signature style "Ecriture." In 1970, he was called back to professorship at Hongik University and served for education until he retired in 1997. He was the dean of the Graduate School of Fine Arts, Hongik University from 1985 to 1986 and the dean of College of Fine Arts from 1986 to 1990. He received an honorary doctorate from the same university in 2000.

Birth of Ecriture and Contemporary Art Movement
In addition to his commitment to education, he also worked hard for the Federation of Artistic & Cultural Organization of Korea for 10 years in 1970s and held the post of chairman from 1977 to 1980. He organized new forms of exhibition such as "Ecole de Séoul" (1975–1999) and "Indépendants"(1973~1980) and Contemporary Art Festivals at each local cities. When he failed the election for a second term in office, he completely concentrated himself on painting in his new studio in Anseong he built in 1981. There he came across to the Korean paper "Hanji" and his "Ecriture" transformed. Art historians agree to divide his Eciture series into three phases of initial stage, middle stage, and last stage. "Ecriture" with Hanji appear both at the middle stage and the last stage. More than 150 pieces of "Ecriture" on canvas were burned in an accidental fire of his Anseong studio in 1996. This was such a shock to Seo-bo as to stop visiting the studio until his wife sold it in 2006. He had a new studio with a living space built in Sungsan-dong, Mapo-gu, Seoul in 1997 and moved his home to that building in 1999. He was near to death because of myocardial infarction in 1994, and again luckily survived a sudden attack of cerebral infarction in 2009.

Late life
He founded the Seo-bo Art and Cultural Foundation, Seoul in 1994 and had remained its president until his first son took the position in 2014. He had his second retrospective exhibition at National Museum of Modern and Contemporary Art in Seoul in 2019. He lives at his new house in Yeonhui-dong, Seoul with his wife and the family of his second son and is still working on paintings to be active against his aging and chronic diseases. He has two sons and one daughter with three grandchildren.

Art
Park's visual language begins with the Korean Civil War in 1950. He had only just entered Hong-Ik University to study art, but instead the interruption of war brought about what one might call a "crash-course". He said many times:

In a similar vein to Paul Klee's famous words, "The more horrifying this world becomes (as it is these days) the more art becomes abstract", Park turned toward abstraction in the 1950s. None of his works from the early days of his career were preserved, and only a photograph of his work, Sunny Spot (1955) remains. The artwork was part of an infamous exhibition titled Four Artists' Show in May 1956, which was a group exhibition composed of Park, Kim Young Whan, Kim Choong Sun and Moon Woo Shik. The show was a resistance against the old art order in Korea that had its roots since the Japanese colonial days.

Park and his tutelage of artist friends founded Hyundae-Mihyup in 1957. Bang Geun Tack, who will later become a well-known art critic in Korea, recognized Hyundae-Mihyup's art as Informel.

Cheon Seung-Bok, a journalist for the Korean Republic, describes Park's artistic style as such:

Park went to Paris in 1961 with the intention of staying for a short while, but due to unforeseen circumstances, he ended up living in Paris for over a year. During his time in Paris, his artistic tendency and outlook changed significantly, which ultimately resulted in his exiting the Art Informel scene toward his own artistic formulation, the Primordialis series in 1962. Park's comments on the Parisian art scene was as such:

Toward the end of the 1960s, Park began experimenting in new forms, the Hereditarius series. Oh Kwang Soo, art critic, described his works as such:

Then in June 1973 at Tokyo Gallery, Park began his ongoing journey through the Ecriture series. This is what Park said at the time:

Exhibitions

2020
 Park Seo-Bo, Johyun Gallery, Busan, Korea.
2019-2020
 Park Seo-Bo, Langen Foundation, Neuss, Germany.
2019
 Retrospective Park Seo-Bo: The Untiring Endeavorer, National Museum of Modern and Contemporary Art, Seoul, Korea.
 Park Seo-Bo Écriture, Galerie Perrotin, Paris, France.
2018
 Park Seo-Bo Ecriture 1967-1976, White Cube, Hong Kong.
 Park Seo-Bo Écriture, Galerie Perrotin, New York, USA.
 修身-朴栖甫個展 (Pursuit of Inner Self), Art Issue Projects, Taipei, Taiwan.
2017
 Park Seo-Bo ZIGZAG: Ecriture 1983-1992, White Cube, London, UK.
2016
 Ecriture 1967-1981, White Cube, London, UK.
 ECRITURE, Galerie Perrotin, Hong Kong.
 Empty the Mind: The Art of Park Seo-Bo, Tokyo Gallery+BTAP, Tokyo, Japan.
 PARK SEO-BO Ecriture: Black and White, Tina Kim Gallery, New York, USA.
 CIGE 2016 (China International Gallery Exposition 2016), Johyun Gallery(Busan), Beijing, China.
 Kintex Spoon Art Show, Keumsan Gallery(Seoul), Kintex, Ilsan, Korea.
2015
 Galerie Perrotin, New York, USA.
 Daejeon Museum of Art, Daejeon, Korea.
 Johyun Gallery, Busan, Korea.
 Esquisse-Drawing 1996-2001, Rho Gallery, Seoul, Korea.

2019-2020
 Marking Time: Process in Minimal Abstraction, Solomon R. Guggenheim Museum, New York, USA.
2019
 Taipei Dandai Art & Ideas (Booth E11), Johyun Gallery (Busan), Taipei, Taiwan
 The 1st Frize Los Angeles 2019, Kukje Gallery(Seoul), Paramount Pictures Studies, LA, USA.
 Art Basel Hong Kong 2019, Kukje Gallery(Seoul), White Cube(London), Galerie Perrotin(Paris) & Tokyo Gallery(Tokyo), Hong Kong.
 On Art, Economy and Materiality, Cranbrook Art Museum, Bloomfield Hills, MI, USA.
 Art Basel 2019, Kukje Gallery(Seoul), White Cube(London), Galerie Perrotin(Paris), Tokyo Gallery(Tokyo), Basel, Switzerland.
 KIAF '19, Kukje Gallery(Seoul), Johyun Gallery(Busan)
 FIAC '19, Galerie Perrotin(Paris), Kukje Gallery(Seoul), White Cube(London).
2018-2019	
 Korean Abstract Art: Kim Whanki and Dansaekhwa, Powerlong Museum, Shanghai, China.2018		
 Korea: Five Artists, Five Hinsek <white>, Tokyo Gallery, Tokyo, Japan.
 Art Basel '18 Hong Kong, Kukje Gallery(Seoul) & Galerie Perrotin(Paris) & Tokyo Gallery+BTAP(Tokyo), Hong Kong.
 Art Basel '18, Kukje Gallery(Seoul) & Galerie Perrotin(Paris) & Tokyo Gallery+BTAP(Tokyo) & Natalie Seroussi(Paris), Basel, Switzerland.
 Art Basel '18 Miami, Kukje Gallery(Seoul) & Galerie Perrotin(Paris), Miami Beach Convention Center, Florida, USA.
 Frieze Masters 2018, Kukje Gallery, Gloucester Green - Regents Park, London, UK.
 West Bund Art & Design 2018, Kukje Gallery(Seoul), Shanghai, China.
 FIAC 2018, Kukje Gallery(Seoul) & Galerie Perrotin(Paris) & White Cube(London), Grand Palais, Paris, France.
 KIAF '18 (Korean International Art Fair), Kukje Gallery(Seoul) & Johyun Gallery(Busan), COEX, Seoul, Korea.2017		
 Ism of Dansaek: Korean Abstract (Held by Tokyo Opera City Cultural Foundation), Tokyo Opera City Art Gallery, Tokyo, Japan. 
 Art Basel '17, Kukje Gallery(Seoul) & Galerie Perrotin(Paris), Basel, Switzerland.
 Art Basel '17 Hong Kong, Kukje Gallery(Seoul) & Galerie Perrotin(Paris) & Johyun Gallery(Busan), Hong Kong.
 Art Basel '17 Miami, Kukje Gallery(Seoul) & Tokyo Gallery+BTAP(Tokyo) & Galerie Perrotin(Paris) & White Cube(London), Miami Beach Convention Center, Florida, USA.
 Special Exhibition Celebrating the 1st Anniversary His Friends from 1970s to 1980s, Kim Tschang-Yeul Art Museum-Jeju, Jeju, Korea. 2016	     	
 KM 9346 La Création Artistique Coréenne S'invite en Morbihan, Musée Domaine de Kerguéhennec, Morbihan, France.
 Dansaekhwa, The Boghossian Foundation - Villa Empain, Brussels, Belgium.
 New Beginnings: Between Gesture and Geometry, The George Economou Collection, Athens, Greece.
 Art Basel '16, Kukje Gallery(Seoul) & Galerie Perrotin(Paris) & White Cube(London), Basel, Switzerland.
 Art Basel '16 Hong Kong, Kukje Gallery(Seoul) & Galerie Perrotin(Paris), Hong Kong.
 Art Basel '16 Miami, Kukje Gallery(Seoul) & Galerie Perrotin(Paris), Miami Beach Convention Center, Florida, USA.
 Art Stage Jakarta 2016, Galerie Perrotin(Paris), Jakarta, Indonesia,
 CIGE 2016 (China International Gallery Exposition), Johyun Gallery(Busan), China World Trade Center, Beijing, China. 
 Korean Modern & Contemporary Art: 11 Artists, Rho Gallery, Seoul, Korea. 
Special Exhibition Celebrating the 130th Anniversary of Korea-France Diplomatic Ties "Part II. Exchange Exhibition of Korean Resident Artists in France", Youngeun Museum, Gwangju, Korea. 
 After Drawing, Gallery Hyundai, Seoul, Korea. 
 KINTEX Spoon Art Show 2016, Keumsan Gallery(Seoul), KINTEX, Ilsan, Korea. 2015-2016 Séoul-Paris-Séoul: Artistes Coréen en France, Musée Cernuschi, Paris, France. 2015		
 Dansaekhwa, Art Issue Project, Taipei, Taiwan.
 Avant Garde Asia: Lines of Korean Masters, Sotheby's a Selling Exhibition, Hong Kong.
 Dansaekhwa (Held by Kukje Gallery, Seoul), Palazzo Contarini Polignac, Venice, Italy.
 Art Basel '15, Kukje Gallery(Seoul) & Galerie Perrotin(Paris) & Blum & Poe(LA), Basel, Switzerland.
 Art Basel '15 Miami, Kukje Gallery(Seoul) & Galerie Perrotin(Paris), Miami Beach Convention Center, Florida, USA.
 FIAC '15, Kukje Gallery(Seoul) & Galerie Perrotin(Paris), Galeries Nationales du Grand Palais, Paris. France. 
 Abu Dhabi Art 2015, Kukje Gallery(Seoul) & Park Ryu Sook Gallery(Seoul), Abu Dhabi, United Arab Emirates.
 A Table of Korean Contemporary Art: II. DanSaekhwa - Park Seo-Bo, Yun Hyong-Keun, Lee Kang So, Lee U Fan, Lee Dong Youb, Chung Sang Hwa, Chung Chang-Sub, Ha Chong-Hyun, Leeahn Gallery, Daegu, Korea. 	

Awards2019 The 64th National Academy of Arts of the Republic of Korea Award (Fine Art Sector), the National Academy of Arts, Republic of Korea (NAA), Seoul, Korea.2018		
 Asia Arts Game Changer Awards Hong Kong, Asia Society, Hong Kong. 2015				
 Awards in the Visual Arts 10, Hirshhorn Museum and Sculpture Garden, Washington,D.C, U.S.A2014 The 12th Lee Donghoon Art Award (Main Prize), Daejeon City & Joongboo Daily News, Daejeon, Korea. 2011		
 The 9th Cultural Day: The Silver Certificate of Merit, Ministry of Culture, Sports & Tourism, Gangleung, Korea.2009 The 4th Special Art Award, Seok Ju Art Foundation, Seoul, Korea. 2008		
 Korea Art Award, The Korean Artist's Day Organizing Committee & Korean Fine Art Association, Seoul, Korea.
 The 28th Suk-Nam Art Prize, Suk-Nam Art Foundation, New York, USA.2004		
 The 9th MANIF Grand Prize (Manifestation d'Art Nouveau International et Forum), MANIF organizing Committee, Seoul, Korea 1999	
 The 1st Exceptional Art Award (Creation Sector), Korean Fine Arts Association, Seoul, Korea. 1996 The Proud Hoingik Alumna Award, Hoingik University Alumni Association, Seoul, Korea. 1995		
 The 44th Seoul Metropolitan Cultural Prize, Seoul Government, Seoul, Korea.1994		
 The Jade Crown of Cultural Medal, Ministry of Culture, Sports & Tourism, Seoul, Korea.
 The Proud Hoingik Alumna Award, Hoingik University Alumni Association, Seoul, Korea. 1993 The Distinguished Service Medal, Seoul Federation of Teachers' Association, Seoul, Korea. 1990 The Kowoon Cultural Award, Kowoon Cultural Foundation, Seoul, Korea. 1987		
 The 1st Art & Culture Grand-Prize, The Federation of Artistic & Cultural Organizations of Korea, Seoul, Korea.
 The Distinguished Educational Service Medal, Korea Youth Worker Association, Seoul, Korea. 1984		
 National Medal: "Seokryu" Medal, Ministry of Education, Seoul, Korea.1979		
 The 11th Culture and Art Prize, Ministry of Public Information, Seoul, Korea.1976		
 The 2nd Joong-Ang Cultural Grand-Prize, Joong-Ang Daily News, Seoul, Korea.1972			
 President's Commendation, Ministry of Home Affairs, Seoul, Korea.1961'''		
 The Jeunes Peintres du Monde à Paris: The 1st Prize (Sarcelles-Themed Competition), National Committee of I.A.A., Paris, France. Awards in the Visual Arts 10, Hirshhorn Museum and Sculpture Garden, Washington,D.C, U.S.A

Collections

Overseas museums

 Musée Cernuschi, Musée des Arts de l'Asie de la Ville de Paris, Paris, France. 
 Pola Museum of Art, Hakone, Japan. 
 The Art Institute of Chicago, Chicago, USA. 
 The Museum of Modern Art (MOMA), NY, USA. 
 Hirshhorn Museum and Sculpture Garden, Washington D.C, USA. 
 Solomon R. Guggenheim Museum, NY, USA. 
 Guggenheim Abu Dhabi, Abu Dhabi, UAE. 
 M+ Museum, Hong Kong. 

 Yuz Foundation, Shanghai, China. 
 Mie Prefectural Art Museum, Mie, Japan. 	
 Shimonoseki City Art Museum, Shimonoseki, Japan. 
 The Museum of Contemporary Art, Hiroshima, Japan. 
 The Museum of Modern Art, Toyama, Japan. 
 Ohara Museum, Kurashiki, Japan. 
 Museum of Contemporary Art, Tokyo, Japan. 
 Fukuoka Art Museum, Fukuoka, Japan.

Korean museums 

 Daegu Art Museum, Daegu. 
 Gyeonggido Museum of Modern Art, Ansan. 
 Museum San, Wonju. 
 Posco Art Museum, Seoul. 
 Total Museum, Seoul. 
 Seoul Museum of Art, Seoul. 
 Busan Metropolitan Art Museum, Busan. 
 Gallery 63, Seoul. 
 Gwangju City Art Museum, Gwangju. 

 Han-Lim Art Museum, Daejeon. 
 The Museum of Ewha Womans University, Seoul. 
 Art Sonje Museum, Gyeongju. 
 Gidang Art Museum, JeJu. 
 Walker Hill Art Center, Seoul. 
 The National Museum of Modern and Contemporary Art, Gwacheon. 
 Leeum Samsung Art Museum, Seoul. 
 The Contemporary Museum of Hong-lk University, Seoul.

Main Collectors
 Steven Cohen Collection, Stanford, USA. 
 Rachofsky Collection, Dallas, USA. 
 SIGG Collection, Switzerland. 
 The George Economou Collection, Athens, Greece. 
 Alexandra Monroe - Private Collector 
 FNAC, Paris, France. 
 SC Johnson & Son Council House, Racine, USA.

References

External links
 SEOBO ART & CULTURAL FOUNDATION
GIZI FOUNDATION 
 PARK SEO-BO'S ART & LIFE

South Korean painters
Living people
People from Yecheon County
1931 births
South Korean contemporary artists